The Progressive Conservative Party of Manitoba won a majority government in the 1977 provincial election, winning thirty-three of fifty-seven seats.  Many of the party's candidates have their own biography pages; information about others may be found here.

Margaret Didenko (Point Douglas)
Didenko received 915 votes (18.59%), finishing second against New Democratic Party incumbent Donald Malinowski.

References

1977